Homalophis is a genus of snakes in the family Homalopsidae. The genus is endemic to Southeast Asia.

Species
The following two species are recognized as being valid.
Homalophis doriae 
Homalophis gyii 

Nota bene: A binomial authority in parentheses indicates that the species was originally described in a genus other than Homalophis.

References

Further reading
Peters W (1871). "Über neuen Reptilien aus Ostafrica und Sarawak (Borneo), vorzüglich aus der Sammlung des Hrn. Marquis J. Doria zu Genua". Monatsberichte der Königlichen Akademie der Wissenschaften zu Berlin 1871: 566–581. (Homalophis, new subgenus, p. 577; H. doriae, new species, p. 577). (in German).

Snake genera
Colubrids
Taxa named by Wilhelm Peters